Eas a' Bhradain is a waterfall of Scotland.

It is located between Marsco and Loch Ainort on the Allt Coire nam Bruadaran of the island of Skye at grid reference

See also
Waterfalls of Scotland

References

Landforms of the Isle of Skye
Waterfalls of Highland (council area)